Angus Morton (born 11 July 1989 in Sydney) is an Australian former professional cyclist.

Major results
Sources:

2010
 7th Road race, National Under-23 Road Championships
2014
 3rd Overall Jelajah Malaysia
2015
 7th Road race, National Road Championships
2016
 8th Overall Tour de Beauce
 10th Overall Tour of Alberta

References

External links

1989 births
Living people
Australian male cyclists
Cyclists from Sydney